Midway Township may refer to:

Midway Township, Hot Spring County, Arkansas, in Hot Spring County, Arkansas
Midway Township, Cottonwood County, Minnesota
Midway Township, St. Louis County, Minnesota
Midway Township, Davidson County, North Carolina, in Davidson County, North Carolina
Midway Township, Stutsman County, North Dakota, in Stutsman County, North Dakota

Township name disambiguation pages